Chudenice is a market town in Klatovy District in the Plzeň Region of the Czech Republic. It has about 800 inhabitants.

Administrative parts
Villages of Bezpravovice, Býšov, Lučice and Slatina are administrative parts of Chudenice.

Notable people
Josef Reicha (1752–1795), cellist
Jaroslav Kvapil (1868–1950), writer
Jan Roubal (1880–1971), entomologist

References

Populated places in Klatovy District
Market towns in the Czech Republic